Vallersund is a village in the municipality of Ørland in Trøndelag county, Norway.

References

Villages in Trøndelag
Ørland